Gerberga or Gerberge was the name of several queens and noblewomen among the Franks.

 Gerberga, the wife and Queen consort of Carloman I, King of the Franks (751 – 791)
 Gerberge (born circa 854), daughter of Pepin, Count of Vermandois
 Geva, wife of Dirk I, Count of Holland (born c.870), name also given as Gerberga 
 Gerberga,  wife of Fulk II, Count of Anjou (c. 905 – 960)
 Gerberga of Saxony (c. 913 – 984), the wife and Queen consort of Louis IV of France, mother of Gerberga of Lorraine
 Gerberge of Lorraine (c. 935 – 978), daughter of Gerberga of Saxony, wife of Adalbert I, Count of Vermandois
 Gerberga (c. 947 – 986/91), mother of Count Otto-William, wife of King Adalbert of Italy and of Henry I, Duke of Burgundy
 Gerberga of Burgundy (965 – 1016), wife of Herman II, Duke of Swabia
 Gerberge, daughter of Rotbold II, Count of Provence (d.1008)
 Gerberga of Lower Lorraine (c.980 – 1018), daughter of Charles, Duke of Lower Lorraine, granddaughter of Gerberga of Saxony, niece of Gerberga of Lorraine, wife of Lambert I, Count of Louvain.
 Ermesinda of Bigorre (1015 – 1049) born Gerberga.
 Gerberga, Countess of Provence (c. 1060 – 1115), succeeded by her daughter Douce of Provence (Dolça de Gévaudaun) and son-in-law Ramon Berenguer III, Count of Barcelona.